There are many Mexican LGBT+ films, a genre that has developed through the film history of the country since the 1970s.

Gay characters have appeared in Mexican cinema since the 1930s, but were not integrated until the ficheras of the 1970s. After this genre of sexploitation comedy, Mexico produced films as part of the wave of Maricón cinema. In 2001, with the success of Y Tu Mamá También, Mexico propelled Latin America into a period of increased LGBT+ film production unified as New Maricón Cinema.

Within Mexico-specific LGBT+ cinema, a conflict of homosexuality and national identity is common and a frequent topic of analysis.

History 
Gay characters in Mexican cinema have been said by Michael K. Schuessler to have started out in films as stereotypes to be ridiculed, but, in line with "the change in conception about homosexuality in Mexican culture", writes that they developed into "complex characters with psychological depth". Schuessler notes the films of Arturo Ripstein and Jaime Humberto Hermosillo, calling them a "transition point" before the works of Julián Hernández that comprise a lot of Mexican gay cinema in the 21st century.

Early gay characters: Fichera

Fichera is the genre of Mexican film that contained the first gay characters. Dominating production in the country in the 1970s and early 1980s — around a third of Mexican films in 1981 were ficheras.:28 They contained characters including transvestites and jotos,:29 and were influenced by even earlier Mexican nightclub films that contained queens performing as a common trope; the type of gay characters in the films may fit the "in-between" type of Richard Dyer's categories.:75 Though showing such characters may have been considered progressive so early in film history, this is the only realization of LGBT themes and the characters were typically small parts and played for comedy by being based in gender deviance.:76 What are now considered among Mexican LGBT+ films in the 1970s and 1980s do not include films in the related but distinct genre of fichera.

Maricón cinema 
Maricón cinema is similar to the fichera but has a structured narrative and less comedy. Films of this era in Mexico include those of Ripstein and Hermosillo, particularly Doña Herlinda y su hijo.:175-176 Fresa y chocolate is said to be a "classic" of the genre, which lasted primarily up to, though with some films produced after, 2001.:178-179

Post-2001: Y Tu Mamá También and New Maricón Cinema 
Several of the notable works of Ximena Cuevas, a Mexican performance artiste who incorporates themes of lesbianism into her works and who has been called "a perfect prototype for an emergent Queer New Latin American Cinema", were performed in 2001.:172 In this year, Y tu mamá también was also released. The popularity and success across the Spanish and English speaking worlds became a trigger moment in Latin American LGBT+ cinema, with more LGBT+ themes appearing in the mainstream.:176-177

In society
The 18+ rating given to Y Tu Mamá También in its native Mexico caused outrage, in part because of its reasoning seen as insufficient to warrant the rating but further because this rating completely bans anyone under 18 from seeing the film, which people believed was censorship as parents could not choose to allow their children to see it, if only as a form of education. This prompted its producers the Cuarón brothers to expose the RTC ratings board, which led to the system being separated from government control. The film was released unrated in the United States, as it was feared it would receive the NC-17 rating, with the high rating also a point of condemnation against the US ratings board in Roger Ebert's review.

Analysis

Homosexuality and national identity 

Several writers analyze representations of gay characters in Mexican cinema, or lack thereof, in relation to fitting into a national identity. In such writings, this identity goes beyond a formulation of machismo and Lucha libre to something more inherently potentially homophobic, where homosexuality is or was traditionally conceived of as not-Mexican.

Alfredo Martínez Expósito writes that though a "conspicuous scarcity of gay characters and themes in Mexican cinema" may be blamed on "a machismo-inflected patriarchy", the image of the homosexual is more likely controlled by "both the image that Mexicans have formed of his own country and the image that Mexico has exported to other countries". Martínez Expósito suggests that "cinematic attempts to introduce gay characters and themes in national cinema should necessarily be doomed" because "Mexicanness" as a concept and identity contains a lot of features associated with patriarchy, which he says explains why Mexican LGBT+ cinema (pre-2001) used various strategies in order to acceptably introduce their themes; characters who are camp but not gay, characters who are closeted, for example, up until "the latent homosexual in Y tu mamá también", which he suggests "tested the limits of national tolerance".

Vinodh Venkatesh, in his writing on the role of children in Latin American LGBT+ films, also notes this theme more recently. Hendrix in 2011's La otra familia is educated on LGBT+ matters and has a representative choice to accept a foreign gay couple as his adoptive parents, implicitly a choice allowing queerness to be introduced into national identity. This film is also noted for instructionally introducing the English term "gay" as a modern and politically correct term to replace the extensive lexicon of gay slurs pertaining only to Mexico, and featuring exaggerated stereotypes of typical Mexican characters in Gabino and Doña Chuy trying to reinforce ideals of machismo, homophobia, and national identity all mixed together to Hendrix.:188-190

Christina Elaine Baker's doctoral thesis looks at Mexican cabaret and different forms of drag as being expressions of queerness outside of the mainstream represented by film. Baker extends her scope to view the queering properties of these performances to be "questioning not just identity constructions, but also the way the body exists in relation to the space and time within which the performances occur", suggesting that "the artists [...] queer, subvert and re-configure expectations of heteronormativity, the whitened mestizo physique and male/female gender binaries associated with mexicanidad," and that by using queer bodies in this way "they propose alternative definitions of what it means to be Mexican." Baker notes that there is no similar representation or challenge to what constitutes national identity in Mexican film of the Golden Age, which she places as the mainstream, but that the performance appears in the LGBT+ cinema movements that succeed it, including fichera and Maricón cinema.

Films 

The bisexual-themed 2001 Y Tu Mamá También was nominated for an Oscar.

See also
LGBT culture in Mexico: Cinema
Nuevo Cine Mexicano

References 

 
Cinema